Sparkle: Original Motion Picture Soundtrack is the soundtrack album for the 2012 Sony/TriStar Pictures film Sparkle, a remake of the 1976 film of the same name. The album was released through Sony Music Entertainment's RCA Records on July 31, 2012. The film's soundtrack includes new recordings of four songs from the original film's soundtrack as well as new original music by Jordin Sparks, Whitney Houston and Cee Lo Green. The soundtrack's first official lead single is the last song recorded by Whitney Houston before she died on February 11, 2012, a duet with R&B/pop singer and American Idol winner Jordin Sparks on a song called "Celebrate". The song premiered on On Air with Ryan Seacrest on May 21, 2012 and was made available for digital download on iTunes on June 5. Whitney Houston's other track, "His Eye is On the Sparrow", debuted only one day after the premiere of "Celebrate". The official music video for "Celebrate" was filmed on May 30, 2012. It made its world premiere on BET's 106 & Park on June 27, 2012.

Background
The songs on the soundtrack are performed by the actors in the film, including Jordin Sparks, Whitney Houston, Cee Lo Green, Carmen Ejogo, Tika Sumpter, and others. Sparkle features songs from the original film written by soul musician Curtis Mayfield as well as new compositions by R&B artist R. Kelly and others. The soundtrack includes new songs not present in the 1976 version of Sparkle: "Celebrate", "His Eye is On the Sparrow", among others. "Celebrate" was sent to radio the week of May 21, 2012 as the first official from the Sparkle soundtrack. The song premiered on On Air with Ryan Seacrest on May 21. and was made available for digital download on iTunes on June 5. Houston's other track, "His Eye is On the Sparrow", debuted only one day after the premiere of "Celebrate".

Composition

Music and themes
Sparkle: Original Motion Picture Soundtrack takes on matters of the celebration, heartache, heartbreak and seduction with a mixture of ballads, mid- and up-tempos.

Release
The Sparkle: Original Motion Picture Soundtrack was released on July 31, 2012; though announced with 13 tracks, it was released with only 11 tracks. Five days before the soundtrack's official release the entire soundtrack was made available to stream exclusively through Sparks' Official store and Essence.com. Jordin Sparks, who worked closely with Houston throughout the making of Sparkle, finds the release of the soundtrack to be "bittersweet." Sparks states, "I worked with my idol and that was a dream come true. I used to watch the Cinderella adaptation with her and Brandy every day after school. But she should really be here promoting it with me and [it's] really hard for me to be doing it alone."

Reception

Critical response

AllMusic writer Andy Kellman gave it three and a half out of five stars and called the soundtrack "an enjoyable if muddled affair" and commended the four songs covered on the new soundtrack stating "the 2012 soundtrack features faithful and decent covers of four songs from the original. When it comes to "Something He Can Feel," it would be an understatement to say that the deck is stacked against Sparks and her vocal partners, Carmen Ejogo and Tika Sumpter." Entertainment Weekly's Melissa Maerz gave Sparkle: Original Motion Picture Soundtrack a B rating and praised Sparks version of "Look Into Your Heart" stating "Sparks bellows Mayfield's power ballad Look Into Your Heart with absolute conviction.
Jody Rosen of Rolling Stone gave the soundtrack 3½ of 5 stars, commenting that "Sparkle revives four soul chestnuts and includes three originals written and produced by R. Kelly. It's the second-most-satisfying retro-soul album of the year – after Kelly's Write Me Back"; however, he was ambivalent towards Houston's last two recordings before her passing, saying that, "Celebrate is forgettable disco-pop, and on the gospel standard "His Eye Is on the Sparrow" Houston sings – and croaks – in a voice octaves lower than in her prime. At times the song has a ravaged magnificence, but mostly it's painful."

Chart performance
 For the week ending August 18, 2012 the soundtrack debuted on the Billboard 200 at # 26, # 7 on the Billboard R&B/Hip-Hop Albums and # 1 on the Billboard Top Soundtracks Albums, selling 12,000 copies in its first week. To date, the soundtrack has sold 86,000 copies.

Singles
"Celebrate" is the first official single from the soundtrack. It is the last song recorded by Whitney Houston before she died on February 11, 2012, a duet featuring her and R&B/pop singer Jordin Sparks. It was officially released on June 5, 2012 for digital download and it was written by R. Kelly who also produced the track. For the week June 16, 2012, "Celebrate" debuted at number 34 on the US Adult R&B Airplay chart, having amassed 45 spins for that week ending. During that same week, "Celebrate" also debuted at number 84 on the US Hot R&B/Hip-Hop Songs chart, and has since peaked at number 54. The music video for "Celebrate" was filmed on May 30, 2012. A preview of the video premiered on Entertainment Tonight on June 4, 2012. The music video made its world premiere on BET's 106 & Park on June 27, 2012.

"His Eye Is on the Sparrow" is the second official single from the soundtrack. The song is a gospel hymn performed by Whitney Houston. Houston is seen performing the song in a church scene in the film trailer. The song was officially released on June 8, 2012 for digital download from Amazon and iTunes. The song was originally written in 1905 by lyricist Civilla D. Martin and composer Charles H. Gabriel. The song is most associated with actress-singer Ethel Waters who used the title for her autobiography.

Track listing
See "Performers" section below for credited singers on each track. Credits adapted from Sparkle: Original Motion Picture Soundtrack liner notes.

Notes
(*) donates as co-producer

Charts

Credits and personnel
Adapted from allmusic.com.

Creativity and management

Debra Martin Chase – Executive Producer
T.D. Jakes – Executive Producer
Erwin Gorostiza – Art Direction, Design
Donnie Meadows – Production Coordination
Carlos Taylor 	– Production Coordination

Mara Brock Akil – Executive Producer
Salim Akil – Executive Producer
Trina Bowman – Production Coordination
Tanisha Broadwater – PProduction Coordination

Performances

Jordin Sparks – Primary Artist
Whitney Houston – Primary Artist
Cee Lo Green – Primary Artist
Olga Konospelsky – Background Vocals
Emma Kummrow – Background Vocals
Charles Parker – Background Vocals

Tika Sumpter – Primary Artist
Carmen Ejogo – Primary Artist
Goapele – Primary Artist
R. Kelly - Additional Vocals
The Rumor – Background Vocals
Voices of Praise – Background Vocals
Eliza Cho – Background Vocals

Technical

Bigg Makk – Arranger, Bass, Keyboards, Producer
R. Kelly – Arranger, Composer, Keyboards, Mixing, Producer
David Boyd – Assistant
Michael Daley – Assistant
Trehy Harris – Assistant
Dabling Harward – Assistant
James Jones III – Bass
Ray Nesmith – Bass
Matt Taylor – Bass
Maria C. Ward – Cello
Joan Collaso – Choir/Chorus
Yvonne Gage – Choir/Chorus
Pastor Chris Harris – Choir/Chorus
Mike Harvey – Choir/Chorus
Jeff Morrow – Choir/Chorus
Lauren Pilot Morrow – Choir/Chorus
Robin Robinson – Choir/Chorus
Claude Kelly – Composer, Producer, Vocal Producer
Guordan Banks – Composer, Vocals
Thomas DeCarlo Callaway – Composer
Warren Felder – Composer
Charles Gabriel – Composer
Charlie Gambetta – Composer
Charles Harmon – Composer
Curtis Mayfield – Composer
Waynne Nugent – Composer
Kevin Risto – Composer
Andrew Wansel – Composer
Autoro "Toro" Whitfield – Drums, Engineer, Piano
Margis Miles – Drums
Abel Garibaldi – Engineer, Programming
Andrew Hey – Engineer, Vocal Engineer
The MIDI Mafia – Engineer, Producer
Ian Mereness – Engineer, Programming
Benjamin Adamson – Engineer

Mike "TrakGuru" Johnson – Engineer
Craig White – Engineer
Joel Geddis – Guitar
Donnie Lyle – Guitar
Andrew Meixner – Guitar
Ben Oniel – Guitar
Mark Strowbridge – Guitar
Harry Wilson – Guitar
Dexter Wansel – Horn Arrangements, String Arrangements
The Regiment – Horn
Kenneth Crouch	– Keyboards, Organ
Rodney East – Keyboards
Herb Powers Jr. – Mastering
Phil Seaford – Mixing Assistant
Dirty Swift – Mixing, Programming
Harvey Mason Jr. – Mixing, Vocal Producer
Kevin "KD" Davis – Mixing
Serban Ghenea – Mixing
John Hanes – Mixing
Jaycen Joshua – Mixing
Spring Aspers – Music Supervisor
Kier Lehman – Music Supervisor
Chuck Harmony – Musician, Producer, Vocal Producer
The Underdogs – Musician, Producer
Jameel Roberts	– Organ, Producer
Ronald "Flippa" Colson @Flippa123 – Producer
Pop Wansel – Producer
Bruce Waynne – Programming
Ron Kerber – Saxophone
Hitomi Oba – Saxophone
Paul Arbogast – Trombone
Michael Jorosz	– Trumpet
Tom Terrell – Trumpet
Nina Cottman – Viola
Ruth S. Fraizier – Viola

Release history

References

Pop soundtracks
Rhythm and blues soundtracks
Soul soundtracks
2012 soundtrack albums
Albums produced by R. Kelly
Musical film soundtracks